Alan la Zouche may refer to:

Alan la Zouche (c. 1136–1190), ancestor of the Barons la Zouche of Ashby
Alan la Zouche (1205–1270), English nobleman and soldier
Alan la Zouche, 1st Baron Zouche of Ashby (1267–1314)
Alan la Zouche, 2nd Baron Zouch of Mortimer (1317–1346)